Katso, also known as Kazhuo (autonyms: ,), is a Loloish language of Xingmeng Township (兴蒙乡), Tonghai County, Yunnan, China. The speakers are officially classified as ethnic Mongols, although they speak a Loloish language.

Lama (2012) lists the following sound changes from Proto-Loloish as Kazhuoish innovations.
 *x- > s-
 *mr- > z-

References

Further reading 
 Donlay, Chris. A Grammar of Khatso. De Gruyter Mouton, 2019. 

Loloish languages
Languages of China